Louis Balsan (22 October 1911 – 22 May 1982) was a French bobsledder who competed in the 1930s. He later became a writer in the 1950s, discussing his involvement in World War II espionage and the history of mountain climbing in the Pyrenees. He was born in Paris.

Bobsleigh career
Competing in two Winter Olympics, Balsan earned his best finish of ninth in the four-man event at Garmisch-Partenkirchen in 1936. At the 1932 Winter Olympics he and Daniel Armand-Delille finished eleventh in the two-man event

Other activities
Balsan was later arrested by the Gestapo in 1942 during World War II for participating in resistance activities. He was taken to Mauthausen and then Loibl Pass, until the 8th Army (UK) liberated the area in 1945. He wrote a testimony of his life in concentration camps in Le Ver Luisant. Other books written by fellow prisoners include Karawanken (memoirs of Gaston Charlet) and The Tunnel (a novel based on the author's experiences). the history of mountain climbing in the Pyrennes. Balsan died in 1982.

References

External links
1932 bobsleigh two-man results
1936 bobsleigh four-man results
1951 article written by Balsan 
Louis Balsan's profile at Sports Reference.com

1911 births
1982 deaths
Sportspeople from Paris
Olympic bobsledders of France
French male bobsledders
Bobsledders at the 1932 Winter Olympics
Bobsledders at the 1936 Winter Olympics
French mountain climbers
French Resistance members
Mauthausen concentration camp survivors
20th-century French memoirists
20th-century French male writers
French male non-fiction writers